A teslīm (also spelled taslim or tasleem) is a refrain in classical Arabic music and Ottoman classical music. It returns several times in the genres of sama'i, peşrev, and saz semaisi.  This term is the equivalent to the Ottoman term mülâzeme.

External links
Teslim - Turkish Musical Forms 
Walter Zev Feldman (20 January 2001). Ottoman music. Grove Music Online 

Arabic music
Turkish music